Lothar Herbert Matthäus (born 21 March 1961) is a German football pundit and former professional player and manager. After captaining West Germany to victory in the 1990 FIFA World Cup where he lifted the World Cup trophy, he was awarded the Ballon d'Or. In 1991, he was named the first FIFA World Player of the Year, and remains the only German to have received the award. He was also included in the Ballon d'Or Dream Team in 2020.

Matthäus held the record (along Mexican goalkeeper Antonio Carbajal) of having played in five FIFA World Cups (1982, 1986, 1990, 1994 and 1998); more than any other outfield player in men's football, until the 2018 World Cup, in which Mexico's Rafael Márquez equalled his record. He also won UEFA Euro 1980, and played in the 1984, 1988 and 2000 UEFA European Championships. In 1999, aged 38, Matthäus was again voted German Footballer of the Year, having previously won the award in 1990.

Matthäus is the most capped German player of all time, retiring with a total of 150 appearances (83 for West Germany) in 20 years, and 23 goals. Matthäus is a member of the FIFA 100 list of the greatest living football players chosen by Pelé. Diego Maradona said of Matthäus, "he is the best rival I've ever had. I guess that's enough to define him", in his book Yo soy el Diego (I am the Diego).

A versatile and complete player, Matthäus is regarded as one of the greatest midfielders of all time, and was renowned for his perceptive passing, positional sense, well-timed tackling, as well as powerful shooting. During his career, he usually played as a box-to-box midfielder, although late in his career he played as a sweeper.

Club career
Lothar Herbert Matthäus was born on 21 March 1961 in Erlangen, Bavaria, West Germany. He spent his early playing days in the youth team of 1. FC Herzogenaurach, located in a small town in Bavaria close to Nuremberg.

Matthäus started his professional career in 1979 with Borussia Mönchengladbach of the Bundesliga, for whom he played until 1984. He then played for Bayern Munich from 1984 to 1988, winning the Bundesliga twice and the DFB-Pokal. They also reached the European Cup final in 1987, leading 1–0 for most of the game until two late goals gave FC Porto the win.

Matthäus and Bayern teammate Andreas Brehme signed with Inter Milan of Serie A in 1988, winning the Scudetto in 1988–89 during their first season, and the Italian Supercup that year as well. Matthäus continued to enjoy further success with Inter, winning the UEFA Cup in 1991 and being named FIFA World Player of the Year. In the final, he scored a penalty in the first leg to help them to their victory over Roma.

Returning to Bayern Munich in 1992, he won four Bundesliga titles, two DFB-Pokals, another UEFA Cup and reached a second European Cup final in 1999. The only major club football honour which eluded Matthäus, for competitions in which he played, was the UEFA Champions League. Famously, he came within two minutes of picking up a winners' medal in 1999, only to have his hopes dashed by Manchester United, who scored two last-minute goals in the final, after he was substituted in the 80th minute of play while the team was still leading 1–0. When the two teams went to collect their medals Matthäus removed his runners-up medal immediately after he received it – it was the second time he had been on the losing side in a final under similar circumstances; in the 1987 final, Bayern had been leading 1–0 most of the game until two late goals gave FC Porto the win. After Matthäus retired, Bayern would win the Champions League in 2000–01 and later that year the Intercontinental Cup. His last official match for Bayern took place in Munich on 8 March 2000 and was a Champions League match against Real Madrid, which Bayern won 4–1.

During the 1999–2000 season, Matthäus moved from Bayern to New York City's MetroStars team of Major League Soccer in the United States. He played in the US from March to October 2000 and retired from professional football afterwards. During his season with the MetroStars, he traveled to St. Tropez when he was supposed to be rehabbing his back.

Matthäus came out of retirement in 2018, at age 57, to play 50 minutes of 1. FC Herzogenaurach's final league game of the season. The team had already secured the league title, and the appearance allowed Matthäus to satisfy his ambition retiring with the club where his career started: "It was always my dream to play my last competitive game here."

International career
 
Matthäus was first called up to the West Germany national squad in 1980, that won the UEFA Euro 1980 in Italy, making his international debut at the tournament in a game against the Netherlands. He also played two games at the 1982 FIFA World Cup in Spain; he was brought on as a substitute in group stage games against Chile and the infamous Disgrace of Gijón game versus Austria. West Germany reached the final, losing to Italy at the Santiago Bernabéu Stadium in Madrid 3–1.

By now, he also had a regular place in the national team for the 1986 World Cup in Mexico, scoring the winner in the round of 16 against Morocco. In the final at the Azteca Stadium in Mexico City, despite his considerable play-making ability, he was assigned by coach Franz Beckenbauer to mark Argentina's Diego Maradona. Maradona did not score in the final, but his pass to Jorge Burruchaga with six minutes left in regulation time set up the winning goal for Argentina, and West Germany lost their second consecutive World Cup final, this time 3–2.

At UEFA Euro 1988 in West Germany, Matthäus captained the team and scored a penalty against the Netherlands (the eventual winners) in the semi-final to give his team a 1–0 lead, but Ronald Koeman leveled the score with a penalty, and then Marco van Basten slid in the winning goal in the final minutes.

His immediate success in Italy's premier football league, the Serie A, was a precursor to the national team which finally managed to triumph at the 1990 FIFA World Cup held in Italy. Six of West Germany's squad played professionally there;  Matthäus and the West German squad played most of the World Cup games at Inter's home stadium the San Siro. West Germany was the best team of the tournament and one of the few to choose an attacking style of play, contrary to previous German teams' more defensive style. Matthäus led his squad from midfield and scored four goals, including two against Yugoslavia. He scored the only goal of the quarter-final against Czechoslovakia from a penalty awarded in the 25th minute of the match. West Germany reached its third consecutive final, a rematch against Maradona-led Argentina, and this time Matthäus and his team emerged victorious 1–0 at the Stadio Olimpico in Rome thanks to Andreas Brehme converting an 85th minute penalty.  Matthäus later said that playing the World Cup in Italy was "like playing a World Cup at home". As team captain, Matthäus hoisted the last World Cup trophy before German reunification in 1990.

He was injured and unable to take part in UEFA Euro 1992 in Sweden; though a reunified Germany made the final but lost 2–0 to surprise Denmark. At the 1994 FIFA World Cup hosted by the United States, he captained the team but now operated as sweeper. He scored a penalty in Germany's quarter-final match against Bulgaria at Giants Stadium in New York City, which was also his record-tying 21st World Cup match, but the Bulgarians scored twice in three minutes to upset the defending champions. USA '94 was expected to be his last tournament, though he did not officially retire from international play. Matthäus was afterwards not called up for the national team, due to feuding with succeeding captain Jürgen Klinsmann and coach Berti Vogts. In his absence Germany won UEFA Euro 1996 which was held in England.

Surprisingly, he was called up for the 1998 World Cup in France as a replacement for the injured sweeper Matthias Sammer. He was on the bench for Germany's victory over the United States, but came in as a substitute against FR Yugoslavia and helped the team to a 2–2 draw. He became the second player to appear in five different World Cup tournaments, tying the record of Mexican goalkeeper Antonio Carbajal. In 2014 the record has also been tied by Italian goalkeeper Gianluigi Buffon, who however has only played in four. In 2015 Homare Sawa and Formiga became the first footballers to appear for a record sixth time at the 2015 FIFA Women's World Cup in Canada. Matthäus played in all the rest of Germany's matches until Croatia knocked them out in Lyon 3–0 in the quarterfinals, taking his total to a record 25.

He earned his last three caps at UEFA Euro 2000 in Belgium and the Netherlands, his 150th cap being against Portugal, where Germany had a disastrous first round exit. Matthäus had a poor performance in the first group game against Romania, causing Oliver Bierhoff and other key German players to demand his benching, but head coach Erich Ribbeck stuck by Matthäus.

Coaching career
One year after ending his illustrious playing career, Matthäus went into coaching, an activity where he has, so far, been much less distinguished. In his print interviews and other media appearances, he has been open about his goal and desire to coach in the German Bundesliga. His hope was that taking coaching jobs abroad would lead to offers from German clubs.

When none came his way even after multiple foreign appointments, he often brought it up in the German press in-between his coaching stints. In a lengthy November 2009 Frankfurter Allgemeine Zeitung interview, Matthäus complained about what he considers to be inadequate treatment he receives in Germany as a former great. He also bemoaned the lack of coaching job offers extended to him in the German Bundesliga—claiming German clubs perceive him as too much of a Bayern supporter and too closely linked with the influential Bild tabloid newspaper to give him a job.

Rapid Wien

His first head coaching experience was at SK Rapid Wien in the Austrian Bundesliga, lasting from 6 September 2001 until 14 May 2002 with mixed results. Matthäus got Rapid Wien to the second round of the UEFA Cup, Round of 16 in the Austrian Cup, and finished in eighth place in Bundesliga.

Partizan
In December 2002, looking to replace their recently sacked head coach Ljubiša Tumbaković, Serbian club FK Partizan hired Matthäus during mid-season winter break, signing the German to an 18-month contract.

Inheriting a team at the top of the league table, Matthäus achieved the immediate goal of steering Partizan to the 2002–03 league title; and did so in convincing fashion, extending the lead over the second-placed cross-town rivals Red Star Belgrade to 19 points at one point. 

The German's finest hour with the club, however, came in August 2003 when Partizan eliminated Newcastle United in the Champions League third qualifying round to reach the 2003–04 competition's group stage. Following the first leg 0–1 loss at home, the cause seemed lost, however, Partizan improbably triumphed 0–1 away at St. James' Park against the third-placed English Premier League club, taking the tie to penalties. The penalty series brought further dramatic changes of momentum before right back Milivoje Ćirković's successful spot-kick in the seventh penalty round finally put Partizan through. Matthäus notably had his back turned to the pitch as couldn't bear to watch the drama of Ćirković's penalty. Drawn in a tough group with Real Madrid, eventual champions FC Porto, and Olympique de Marseille, Partizan finished last thus missing out on the UEFA Cup spot.

On 13 December 2003, right after finishing the final league match of the first half of the season before the winter break (0–1 win away at FK Železnik), Matthäus abruptly resigned his Partizan post by addressing the players and club leadership in private. A club spokesperson said Matthäus would clear everything up at a press conference scheduled for two days later, but it was already widely speculated through reports in the Hungarian press that the German had agreed terms with the Hungarian Football Federation to coach the Hungary national team. The rumours proved true as he officially signed the contract in Budapest and also got introduced to the media at Kempinski Hotel Corvinus.

Four months after leaving Belgrade, in mid-April 2004, the row over the terms of Matthäus' contract with Partizan was opened with both parties publicly going back and forth at each other. It began with Matthäus, by now Hungarian national team head coach, giving a detailed interview to Serbian press and accusing Partizan club leadership of breaching the additional terms of his contract. It became known on that occasion that his initial contract with Partizan that had been finalized on 1 January 2003 included a base guaranteed part as well additional premium clauses giving him between 5–10% from players' transfers and shirt sponsorships as well as Champions League bonus incentives. Matthäus claimed that after none of that was honoured he gave up on asking for his percentages of the Danko Lazović and Zvonimir Vukić transfers as well as Superfund shirt sponsorship deal due to "not wanting to upset the team atmosphere during Champions League qualifying", but instead pushed for the additional terms to be renegotiated. After successful Champions League qualification, the additional terms were in fact renegotiated with Partizan's general secretary Žarko Zečević so that both parties agreed to put the previous additional terms out of effect and instead now give Matthäus 15% of Igor Duljaj's (the club's best young asset at the time) future transfer abroad as well as to allow Matthäus to leave the club any time he wanted without penalties. Duljaj was sold to Shakhtar Donetsk in January 2004 for US$4 million, and Matthäus claimed Partizan failed to pay him the agreed percentage ($600,000 or €469,500). The club responded two days later in a lengthy press release saying that they don't owe him any money. One day after that, Matthäus decided to sue Partizan for the amount of US$600,000 before Sports Arbitration Court in Lausanne, Switzerland.

Hungary national team
Matthäus became manager of the Hungary national football team on 14 December 2003. Taking over the national team of a country once synonymous with world class football that had over the decades in the meantime fallen to the point of being unable to qualify for a major competition since the 1986 FIFA World Cup, Matthäus was given the task of qualifying for the 2006 World Cup as part of the Hungarian Football Federation's (MLSZ) ambitious plan of returning on the path of former 1950s glory. After being drawn in a tough group with Sweden, Croatia and Bulgaria that goal looked increasingly difficult.

The campaign started in the autumn of 2004 and fairly quickly it became obvious Hungary were in over their heads. Opening 3–0 loss away at Croatia in early September was somewhat offset four days later by a 3–2 hard fought home win versus Iceland. A month later, Matthäus' Hungary faced another important test away from home, this time at Sweden and once again it finished in disappointment with another demoralizing 3–0 loss. Before the winter break, Hungary managed to beat the minnows of the group Malta thus finishing the autumn part of the qualifying in fourth place with six points, mathematically still within striking distance of the leading trio. Notable was a 2–0 win in a friendly in Kaiserslautern against Germany on 6 June 2004.

As the qualifiers resumed in late March 2005, Hungary hosted Bulgaria in what was pretty much a must win match for Matthäus' squad, however they only managed a draw right at the end with the goal coming in 90th minute for a 1–1 final scoreline. As Croatia and Sweden both won on the same occasion, the leading duo of teams now tangibly separated themselves from the pack of chasers, all of which meant that in order to qualify Hungary would have to win all its remaining fixtures and even get some outside help in terms of favourable results elsewhere. Such improbable scenario failed to materialize and they ended up in fourth place with 14 points from 10 matches, well behind Croatia and Sweden who earned 25 and 24 points, respectively. However, Matthäus was allowed to finish out the campaign behind the bench, and was even offered Hungarian citizenship, which he at the time said he would accept. There's no word whether he actually did. Matthäus left the Hungarian national team on 11 January 2006.

After leaving the Hungary post, Matthäus was vocally critical of the Hungarian Football Federation (MLSZ), accusing it in November 2007 of "not contributing, but exploiting Hungarian football" before adding that "it is not coincidental that the Hungarian bid to host Euro 2012 didn't receive any votes".

Atlético Paranaense
Matthäus signed a one-year contract to coach Brazilian club Atlético Paranaense from the city of Curitiba on 11 January 2006. However, after only seven matches in charge (five wins, two draws) from the start of the 2006 Paraná state championship he quit the club in March 2006 citing the need to be closer to his family. The way he left raised some questions about his professionalism. Apparently, only five weeks after signing a contract he informed club officials about a need to rush back to Europe in order to deal with an urgent personal problem, but assured them he'd be back in 3–4 days. After missing for two weeks, he faxed in his resignation on 20 March and never even went back to Brazil to pick up his personal belongings. Some ten days later, Atlético put out a release mentioning that Matthäus ran up R$13,000 (US$5,915) in phone charges that the club wanted him to pay. The club even posted the bill on their website.

Red Bull Salzburg
On 19 May 2006, only two months following the bizarre Brazilian episode, Matthäus was announced as coach of Red Bull Salzburg (formerly Austria Salzburg) for the upcoming 2006–07 season. Shortly, the club also signed Giovanni Trapattoni (incidentally Matthäus' former coach at both Inter Milan and Bayern) to be their director of football. In practice, this meant that Trapattoni and Matthäus essentially shared coaching duties.

Despite co-leading the team to the Austrian league title by a large margin, Matthäus would eventually be fired on 12 June 2007 by unanimous decision of the Red Bull Salzburg's board of directors.

Maccabi Netanya
On 13 April 2008, it was announced that Matthäus signed with Israeli club Maccabi Netanya to coach the team from the beginning of the 2008–09 season.

On 29 April 2009, with the Israeli league season still ongoing and Netanya sitting in fourth place, it was announced that Matthäus will not be back for the second season once the current one is finished. The reason cited was the financial trouble that the club was going through. Matthäus' club finished the league season in fourth spot.

Bulgaria national team

On 23 September 2010, it was announced that Matthäus would be the new coach of the Bulgarian national team after the resignation of Stanimir Stoilov a few weeks earlier. His contract was for one year with the option for a two-year extension.

He started with a 1–0 win against Wales in Cardiff on his debut. Matthäus led Bulgaria to their first win in 2010 and in the UEFA Euro 2012 qualification campaign. On 12 October 2010, he led Bulgaria to a 2–0 win over Saudi Arabia in a friendly. On 17 November 2010, in a friendly played in Sofia, Bulgaria lost to Serbia 0–1. Despite winning his first match in the qualifiers against Wales, Bulgaria under Matthäus were unable to qualify for Euro 2012, following draws with Switzerland and Montenegro, as well as a home loss against England. On 19 September 2011, it was revealed that Matthäus had been sacked. The match against Switzerland was his final match.

In April 2018, he was one of 77 applicants for the vacant Cameroon national team job.

Columnist and TV pundit

From 2001 until 2009, in parallel and in-between his coaching jobs, Matthäus wrote a column for the German weekly sports magazine Sport Bild.

He also worked as in-studio TV pundit on a variety of television networks during big football competitions: for the German pay television channel Premiere during the 2002 and 2006 FIFA World Cups, for the German channel ZDF during UEFA Euro 2004, for Eurosport during UEFA Euro 2008, for the Arabian network Al Jazeera Sports during the 2010 FIFA World Cup, for the Iranian channel IRIB during the 2014 FIFA World Cup and 2015 AFC Asian Cup, and for the British TV network ITV during UEFA Euro 2016. Since the 2012–13 Bundesliga season, he worked as an expert for the Pay TV broadcaster Sky Deutschland.

He has further participated in a special É Campeão for the Brazilian channel SporTV.

Style of play

Renowned for his positioning, technical ability, stamina, passing and long range shooting abilities, Matthäus is widely considered by many to be one of the greatest and most complete midfielders of all time, and even by some as one of the greatest players of all time. Primarily a box-to-box midfielder, he was also capable of playing as an attacking midfielder or defensive midfielder. 

Journalist Jacques Thibert, writing for France Football, who awarded Matthäus the 1990 Ballon d'Or, described him as a player that despite not being sublime in anything individually, was good in every aspect of the game, which allowed him to be at ease in every area of the pitch. Furthemore, Thibert credited his Inter manager Giovanni Trapattoni for turning him into a more creative, assertive and rhythmic player. At Inter under Trapattoni, Matthäus excelled in a free role in a three-man midfield, with either Gianfranco Matteoli or Sergio Battistini serving as defensive midfielder and Nicola Berti as a box-to-box.

Well into his 30's and coupled with injuries led to then Germany national team manager Berti Vogts's decision to convert Matthäus into a sweeper, a position that he would later play at his final five years in Bayern. As a sweeper, Matthäus enjoyed great freedom, as he could defend and do offensive runs into the opposing team's defensive area, and also exert influence into Bayern's attacking game. Aside from his passing and long range shooting abilities, Matthäus was also an expert free kick and penalty taker. In addition to his footballing skills, Matthäus was also praised for his winning mentality, determination and commanding presence on the pitch.

Personal life
Lothar Matthäus was born to Heinz (1930–2019) and Katharina (1931–2020) Matthäus. His father who was born in southern Silesia, fled west across the Oder during the Soviet invasion in 1944, then worked as a canteen manager, while his mother worked for Puma.

He has four children, and has been married five times. During his first marriage that lasted from 1981 until 1992, wife Silvia gave birth to two daughters Alisa (born 1986) and Viola (born 1988). In 1994, he married Swiss model and TV presenter Lolita Morena with whom he had a son, Loris (born 1992). The marriage ended in 1999.

While coaching FK Partizan in Belgrade, he met 31-year-old Serbian socialite Marijana Kostić who became his third wife on 27 November 2003. It was her third marriage as well. By late 2007, the couple separated and she filed for divorce. Their divorce became official in late January 2009 following the conclusion of a year-long court case in Salzburg, Austria (their last residence) over the division of assets.

In December 2008, 47-year-old Matthäus married 21-year-old Ukrainian model Kristina Liliana Chudinova. The ceremony was held in Las Vegas. They met a year earlier at the Oktoberfest beer festival in Munich. The couple lived in Tel Aviv, Israel, where Liliana studied journalism in a local university; but started living separately by early 2010.

Matthäus and Anastasia Klimko have a son, Milan (born April 2014). The marriage ended in 2021.

Media appearances
Matthäus features in EA Sports' FIFA video game series; he was on the cover of the German edition of FIFA 2001, and features in the FIFA 14, FIFA 15, FIFA 16, FIFA 17, FIFA 18 , FIFA 19 and FIFA 20 as an Ultimate Team Legend. Matthäus was also prominently featured in the opening video scene of EA's Euro 2000 video game, with Paul Oakenfold transforming the real Matthäus into an interactive digital player he controls in the game with his turntables. In August 2019, Matthäus became the face of turn-based football management game Football, Tactics & Glory; he does not actually appear in the game itself.

Matthäus had a guest role together with Joanna Tuczyńska in the television series Alarm für Cobra 11 – Die Autobahnpolizei, in which he played himself in March 2012. In June 2012, VOX broadcast a documentary titled "Lothar – immer am Ball".

Career statistics

Club

International

Scores and results list West Germany's and Germany's goal tally first, score column indicates score after each Matthäus goal

Managerial statistics

Honours

Bayern Munich
 Bundesliga: 1984–85, 1985–86, 1986–87, 1993–94, 1996–97, 1998–99
 DFB-Pokal: 1985–86, 1997–98
 DFB-Ligapokal: 1997, 1998, 1999
 DFB-Supercup: 1987
 UEFA Cup: 1995–96
UEFA Champions League runner up: 1998–99

Inter Milan
 Serie A: 1988–89
 UEFA Cup: 1990–91

MetroStars
 MLS Eastern Division Champion: 2000

Germany
 FIFA World Cup: 1990
 UEFA European Championship: 1980
 U.S. Cup: 1993

Individual
 Ballon d'Or: 1990
 IFFHS World's Best Player: 1990
 World Soccer Awards Player of the Year: 1990
 FIFA World Player of the Year: 1991
 FIFA World Cup Silver Ball: 1990
 FIFA World Cup All-Star Team: 1990
 UEFA European Championship Team of the Tournament: 1988
 Onze d'Or: 1990
 Onze de bronze: 1991
 Footballer of the Year (Germany): 1990, 1999
 Goal of the Year (Germany): 1990, 1992
 kicker Bundesliga Team of the Season: 1982–83, 1984–85, 1987–88, 1992–93, 1993–94
 Pirata d'Oro (Inter Milan Player of the Year): 1991
 FIFA XI: 1996, 1997, 2001
 FIFA 100
 Golden Foot legends award: 2012
 IFFHS Legends
 Inter Milan Hall of Fame: 2018
 Bayern Munich All-time XI
 Ballon d'Or Dream Team: 2020
 IFFHS All-time Men's B Dream Team: 2021

See also
List of men's footballers with 100 or more international caps
FIFA World Cup awards

References

External links

  

1961 births
Living people
Sportspeople from Erlangen
Footballers from Bavaria
German footballers
Association football sweepers
Association football midfielders
Association football utility players
Borussia Mönchengladbach players
FC Bayern Munich footballers
Inter Milan players
New York Red Bulls players
Bundesliga players
Serie A players
Major League Soccer players
Major League Soccer All-Stars
UEFA Cup winning players
World Soccer Magazine World Player of the Year winners
FIFA World Player of the Year winners
Ballon d'Or winners
Germany under-21 international footballers
Germany B international footballers
Germany international footballers
UEFA Euro 1980 players
1982 FIFA World Cup players
UEFA Euro 1984 players
1986 FIFA World Cup players
UEFA Euro 1988 players
1990 FIFA World Cup players
1994 FIFA World Cup players
1998 FIFA World Cup players
1999 FIFA Confederations Cup players
UEFA Euro 2000 players
UEFA European Championship-winning players
FIFA World Cup-winning captains
FIFA World Cup-winning players
FIFA Century Club
FIFA 100
German expatriate footballers
German expatriate sportspeople in Italy
German expatriate sportspeople in the United States
Expatriate footballers in Italy
Expatriate soccer players in the United States
German football managers
SK Rapid Wien managers
FK Partizan managers
Hungary national football team managers
Club Athletico Paranaense managers
FC Red Bull Salzburg managers
Maccabi Netanya F.C. managers
Bulgaria national football team managers
Austrian Football Bundesliga managers
Serbian SuperLiga managers
Campeonato Brasileiro Série A managers
Israeli Premier League managers
German expatriate football managers
German expatriate sportspeople in Austria
German expatriate sportspeople in Serbia
German expatriate sportspeople in Hungary
German expatriate sportspeople in Brazil
German expatriate sportspeople in Israel
German expatriate sportspeople in Bulgaria
Expatriate football managers in Austria
Expatriate football managers in Serbia
Expatriate football managers in Hungary
Expatriate football managers in Brazil
Expatriate football managers in Israel
Expatriate football managers in Bulgaria
West German expatriate footballers
West German expatriate sportspeople in Italy